Ethel Stark,  (25 August 1910 – 16 February 2012) was a Canadian violinist and conductor.

Born in Montreal, Quebec, she studied at the McGill Conservatory of Music with Alfred De Sève and Alfred Whitehead. From 1928 to 1934, she studied at the Curtis Institute of Music with Lea Luboshutz, Louis Bailly, Artur Rodziński, Fritz Reiner and Carl Flesch. For many years she taught on the faculty of the Conservatoire de musique du Québec à Montréal.

In 1979 she was made a Member of the Order of Canada. In 2003 she was made a Grand Officer of the National Order of Quebec. In 1980 she was awarded a Doctor of Laws, honoris causa degree from Concordia University.

She died in Montreal and was buried in Montreal's Spanish and Portuguese Congregation Cemetery.

A park in Montreal has been named after her. Parc Ethel-Stark is located at the corner of Prince-Arthur Ouest and Clark streets.

Montreal Women's Symphony 
In 1940, at the age of 29, Ethel founded the Montreal Women's Symphony Orchestra, which she conducted until 1960. She was the first conductor of an all women's symphony. The decision to form this orchestra was a spur of the moment decision that Stark made.

The first performance of the Montreal Women's Symphony took place in the summer of 1940 to a crowd of 5,000 people. Critics raved that it was ingenious and that it “had broken away from conservative ideas about music and women in music."The Toronto Symphony “Pop” Concert was guest conducted by Ethel in February 1946. The performance was received warmly, and gaining recognition and popularity, the Montreal Women's Symphony signed a contract in autumn of 1947. Ethel was noted as feeling, “that the contract to play at Carnegie Hall is not so much to her and her musicians the answer to every artist’s hopes and ambitions as an acknowledgment that at last it is accepted that there’s room for women in music."

David Gutnick of the CBC Radio One program The Sunday Edition produced a radio documentary about the Montreal Women's Symphony Orchestra in April 2012. You can hear the orchestra and interview segments with Ethel Stark and musicians Pearl Aronoff (Rosemarin), Lyse Vezina and Violet Grant States who was the first black woman in a Canadian symphony orchestra and the first black woman symphony musician to play Carnegie Hall. You also hear from musicologist Maria Noriega who wrote her master's thesis (University of Calgary) and is writing a doctoral dissertation on women in classical music in Canada.

References

External links 

 Ethel Stark at The Canadian Encyclopedia
 http://www.cbc.ca/thesundayedition/documentaries/2012/04/29/it-wasnt-teatime/

1910 births
2012 deaths
Canadian centenarians
Canadian classical violinists
Academic staff of the Conservatoire de musique du Québec à Montréal
Grand Officers of the National Order of Quebec
Jewish Canadian musicians
Members of the Order of Canada
Musicians from Montreal
20th-century classical violinists
Women classical violinists
Curtis Institute of Music alumni
20th-century Canadian women musicians
20th-century Canadian conductors (music)
Women centenarians
Women conductors (music)
20th-century Canadian violinists and fiddlers